Counting in prehistory was first assisted by using body parts, primarily the fingers. This is reflected in the etymology of certain number names, such as in the names of ten and hundred in the Proto-Indo-European numerals, both containing the root *dḱ also seen in the word for "finger" (Latin digitus, cognate to English toe).

Early systems of counting using tally marks appear in the Upper Paleolithic.
The first more complex systems develop in the Ancient Near East together with the development of early writing out of proto-writing systems.

Background

Numerals originally developed from the use of tally marks as a counting aid, with the oldest examples being about 35,000 to 25,000 years old.

Development
Counting aids like tally marks become more sophisticated in the Near Eastern Neolithic, developing into numerical digits in various types of proto-writing during the Chalcolithic.

Old world
Egyptian numerals
Babylonian cuneiform numerals
Aegean numerals

New world

Early numerals in Unicode

Unicode's Supplementary Multilingual Plane has a number of code point ranges reserved for prehistoric or early historic numerals:
 Aegean Numbers (10100–1013F)
 Ancient Greek Numbers (10140–1018F)
 Cuneiform Numbers and Punctuation (12400–1247F)
 Counting Rod Numerals (1D360–1D37F)

See also

References

Citations

Sources cited

External links

Numeral systems
Numerals